The Colorado lunar sample displays are two commemorative plaques consisting of small fragments of Moon specimen brought back with the Apollo 11 and Apollo 17 lunar missions and given in the 1970s to the people of the state of Colorado by United States President Richard Nixon as goodwill gifts.

Description

Apollo 11

Apollo 17

History 

The Colorado Apollo 11 lunar samples plaque was first displayed in a low-security location with easy public access on the first floor of the Colorado State Capitol building beginning around 1992. By 2010 it had been moved to a secure display on the third floor, when the Capitol Building Advisory Committee decided to move it to an unknown location until it could come up with plans for a permanent secure location. This action was prompted by speculative news reports about the high value of the material and concern about the potential for theft.

Some time after NASA astronaut Jack Lousma presented the Colorado Apollo 17 lunar sample display to then-Colorado Governor John Vanderhoof on January 9, 1974, it was considered lost until it was located in June 2010 in Vanderhoof's home. A Denver news channel reported that Vanderhoof, who left office in 1975, "didn't know what to do with the display once he left office so he simply decided to take it with him". The plaque display with the Apollo 17 "Moon rock" has since been moved to the Colorado School of Mines, where it is displayed in the Geology Museum.

See also
 List of Apollo lunar sample displays

References

Further reading 

 

Stolen and missing moon rocks
Tourist attractions in Dover, Delaware